The 2024 United States Olympic trials for Marathon will be staged in Orlando, Florida. It is serving as the national championships in track and field for the United States and is organized by USA Track and Field, greater Orlando sports commission and Track Shack. During the 2024 Paris Olympic Games, track and field events will be held between Thursday, August 1 and Sunday, August 11 with competition beginning each day at 4 am. ET.

The results of the event determined qualification for the American Olympic team at the 2024 Summer Olympics, to be held in Paris. Provided they had achieved the Olympic standard or are in the World Athletics ranking quota, the top three athletes in each event gained a place on the Olympic team.

In the event that a leading athlete did not hold the standard, or an athlete withdrew, the next highest finishing athlete with the standard was selected instead. USA Track and Field announced their Olympic roster based on United States Olympic & Paralympic Committee and Team USA guidelines.

Men's results 
Key:

Men track events

Men field events

Notes

Women's results 
Key:
.

Women track events

Women field events

Schedule

Qualification 
An athlete is eligible for "automatic qualification" (USATF Rule 8) if that athlete has accomplished the following:
Placing 1st at either the 2022 USATF Marathon Championship or the 2023 USATF Marathon Championship
Earned an individual medal in the 2022 World Athletics Championships Marathon or 2023 World Athletics Championships Marathon
Was a member of the 2020 U.S. Olympic Marathon Team.

Notes

References 

Results
Main website Results page

External links 
Official webpage at USATF

USA Outdoor Track and Field Championships
United States Olympic trials
US Olympic Trials
Track, Outdoor
United States Summer Olympics Trials